An Invisible Orchard is an album by American jazz trumpeter, composer and arranger Shorty Rogers which was recorded for  RCA Victor  in 1961 but remained unreleased by the label until 1997.

Track listing 
All compositions by Shorty Rogers.

 "Inner Space" - 4:42
 "Saturnian Sunrise" - 4:03
 "Light Years" - 4:39
 "Like Space" - 4:12
 "La Valse" - 5:32
 "Lunar Montunar" - 5:14    
 "El Rojo Bajo" - 5:54
 "An Invisible Orchard" - 9:35

Recorded at RCA Victor's Music Center of the World, Hollywood, CA on February 28, 1961 (tracks 3-5), April 18, 1961 (tracks 1 & 8) and April 26, 1961 (tracks 2, 6 & 7)

Personnel 
Shorty Rogers - flugelhorn, conductor, arranger
Conte Candoli (tracks 3-5), Ollie Mitchell, Al Porcino (tracks 1, 2 & 6-8), Ray Triscari, Stu Williamson - trumpet 
Harry Betts, Frank Rosolino - trombone
Marshall Cram (tracks 1 & 8), George Roberts (tracks 2-7), Kenneth Shroyer - bass trombone
Paul Horn, Bud Shank - flute, alto saxophone 
Harold Land, Bill Perkins - tenor saxophone 
Chuck Gentry (tracks 3-5), Bill Hood (tracks 1, 2 & 6-8) - baritone saxophone
Pete Jolly - piano
Emil Richards - vibraphone
Red Mitchell - bass 
Mel Lewis - drums

References 

Shorty Rogers albums
1997 albums
RCA Records albums
Albums arranged by Shorty Rogers